The Impossible Spy is a 1987 television film based on the true story of an Israeli civilian spy, Eli Cohen, who was recruited into Israel's secret intelligence agency (the Mossad) in the 1960s to become a spy in Damascus.  Prior to his capture in 1965, Cohen was about to be appointed the third-most powerful figure in Syria—the Deputy Minister of Defense. Cohen's memorization of Syria's individual gun placements along the Golan Heights enabled Israel to defeat Syria in the Six-Day War in 1967.

The film's executive producer was Harvey Chertok; it was directed by Jim Goddard and starred John Shea, Eli Wallach, and Sasson Gabai.

The Impossible Spy was released in 1987 and won an HBO CableACE Award for Best Picture.

References

1987 films
1987 television films
1987 documentary films
Spy television films
Films directed by Jim Goddard
American documentary television films
CableACE Award winners
Films set in Israel
Films set in Syria
Films set in the 1960s
1980s American films